Du Dang (born May 12, 1996), more commonly known by his nickname NuckleDu, is an American fighting game player known for playing Guile and Decapre in Ultra Street Fighter IV, Guile and Zangief in Street Fighter X Tekken, and Guile and Rainbow Mika in Street Fighter V. NuckleDu was ranked as the 13th best player in Ultra Street Fighter IV by EventHubs, and was ranked at #19 in the previous year and #32 in 2013. In Street Fighter V, he was undeniably the most successful player in the latter half of Season 1.

Gaming career
NuckleDu is one of the best players in the United States, and has multiple major tournaments victories. In 2012 he qualified for the Street Fighter 25th Anniversary Grand Finals through the New York City qualifier while netting 13th place being sponsored by Empire Arcadia at the time. He was invited for 2013's Capcom Cup for the Street Fighter X Tekken event in which he received fifth place, being defeated by Justin Wong in Winners and Dexter "Tampa Bison" James in Losers. In August 2014, NuckleDu announced his departure from Empire Arcadia following several other players during the few months. A few months after his EMP departure, he would be signed by professional eSports company Team Curse. NuckleDu would later qualify into 2014's Capcom Cup through the points leaderboards, being ranked at 6th out of the non-qualified players. He would proceed to get 9th place notably upsetting Darryl "Snake Eyez" Lewis in the process.

In 2015, Team Curse merged into Team Liquid which resulted in NuckleDu being acquired by the latter. NuckleDu notably won both Apex 2015 and Combo Breaker in dominant fashion, defeating Snake Eyez and Ricki Ortiz in their respective grand finals. At EVO 2015, NuckleDu placed 7th out of ~2200 people in Ultra Street Fighter IV, bowing out to Bruce "GamerBee" Hsiang. However, during the summer, there was some controversy regarding the EGL Dallas tournament, which NuckleDu won the Ultra Street Fighter IV tournament and was promised $5,000 in prize winnings. However EGL failed to pay him as well as other tournament winners, which resulted in the company going bankrupt. NuckleDu was one of the 32 players in the 2015 Capcom Cup in which he placed 13th, also being the second highest placing American in the tournament. He qualified once again through points leaderboards.

NuckleDu would later pick up Street Fighter V, notably taking 2nd at DreamHack Austin over Justin Wong. Alex Valle commented saying that players like NuckleDu need to have a superior neutral game in order to beat Wong.

He made an impressive run through the most-prized tournament of 2016, Capcom Cup 2016, without losing a set and won the competition, landing the big prize of US$230,000 for the 1st place. He played a strong mix of Guile and R. Mika throughout the Pro Tour season, and his hard reads and feisty gameplay made him a fan favorite.

NuckleDu left Team Liquid in December 2017.

On July 19, 2018, after going almost a year without a sponsor and started to jokingly giving himself the "sponsorship" tag "My Wallet" in tournaments, Ghost Gaming announced via a Tweet that they have signed on NuckleDu as their debut FGC player and that his first tournament underneath the sponsorship would be Defend the North 2018.

On January 1, 2019, NuckleDu announced on his Twitter that he was officially a free agent, then on February 13, 2019, he announced his signing to the team Echo Fox.

On July 6, 2020, NuckleDu announced on his Twitter his indefinite retirement after a devastating car crash left him injured.

On September 9, 2022, Capcom Fighters announced on Twitter that NuckleDu would return to the Street Fighter Pro League 2022

Playstyle
In Ultra Street Fighter IV, NuckleDu is known as a master of charge characters. His offensive playstyle with Guile is considered unorthodox and attracts viewers. While playing as Decapre, he is known for having a tricky yet unpredictable playstyle which adds to his character selection. NuckleDu is also known for his excessive taunting during matches in the form of Guile's shades, which players find offensive and have labelled him as a villain because of it.

In Street Fighter V, NuckleDu's Nash is considered offensive usually beginning with fast-paced movement later turning into a slugfest, a playstyle he is familiar with when playing as the character.

Personal life
Dang was born on May 12, 1996, in Tampa, Florida. He has a pet dog named Tofu that he cares for and helps him avoid depression. NuckleDu is of Vietnamese ancestry, and his family is from there. In an interview with Chris Bahn of PVP Live, NuckleDu stated he has a fear of flying which is why he rarely travels outside of the United States, but desires to visit Australia and Vietnam.

In 2017, NuckleDu donated his DreamHack Montreal 2017 winnings to the Hurricane Irma relief, in which the hurricane affected his home state of Florida.

Tournament results

References and notes

External links
 NuckleDu's Player Profile - Shoryuken Rankings
 NuckleDu on Facebook
 NuckleDu on Twitter
 NuckleDu on Twitch

1996 births
Living people
People from Tampa, Florida
American esports players
American people of Vietnamese descent
Fighting game players
Team Curse players
Team Liquid players
Team Razer players
Empire Arcadia players
Street Fighter players